Ledermanniella thalloidea is a species of plant in the family Podostemaceae. It is endemic to Cameroon. Its natural habitats are subtropical or tropical moist lowland forests and rivers. It is threatened by habitat loss.

References

thalloidea
Endemic flora of Cameroon
Vulnerable plants
Taxonomy articles created by Polbot